College Nature Park is a park in Troutdale, Oregon, United States. The  is adjacent to Mt. Hood Community College.

References

External links

 

Parks in Multnomah County, Oregon
Troutdale, Oregon